Boring sponge may refer to several different species of sponges:

 Cliona californiana, the yellow boring sponge or sulphur sponge
 Cliona celata, commonly named the red boring sponge
 Cliona viridis, commonly named the green boring sponge
 Dragmacidon lunaecharta, commonly named the red boring sponge
 Pione vastifica, commonly named the red boring sponge